Freddie Forsland is a Swedish former footballer who played as a goalkeeper.

References

Association football goalkeepers
Swedish footballers
Allsvenskan players
Malmö FF players
Living people
Year of birth missing (living people)